Russell Gene Wayt (born October 6, 1942) is a former American football linebacker in the National Football League for the Dallas Cowboys. He played college football at Rice University.

Early years
Wayt attended White Oak High School. He accepted a football scholarship from Rice University. He was a two-way player at fullback and linebacker. As a sophomore, he was second on the team with 70 carries for 277 yards (4-yard avg.). 

As a junior, he was third on the team with 43 carries for 161 yards (3.7-yard avg.) and one touchdown. As a senior, he posted 13 carries for 105 yards (fourth on the team), a 8.1-yard average (led the team) and one touchdown.

Professional career
Wayt was selected by the Dallas Cowboys in the eighth round (103rd overall) of the 1965 NFL Draft. He also was selected by the Houston Oilers in the sixth round (43rd overall) of the 1965 AFL Draft. On November 31, 1964, he opted to sign with the Cowboys.

As a rookie in training camp, he was moved to tight end. During the season he was switched to linebacker. He was released before the start of the 1966 season.

References

1942 births
Living people
People from Gregg County, Texas
Players of American football from Texas
American football linebackers
Rice Owls football players
Dallas Cowboys players